Mircea Snegur (born 17 January 1940) is a Moldovan politician who served as the first president of Moldova from 1990 to 1997. Before that, he served as the chairman of the Presidium of the Supreme Soviet from 1989 to 1990 (head of state) and chairman of the Supreme Soviet from 27 April to 3 September 1990.

Early life and education
Snegur was born in Trifănești, in Soroca District to Ivan and Anna Snegur. In 1957, he graduated from the high school in Frumușica, Florești District, and went on to study at the Agricultural State University of Moldova, from which he graduated in 1961. He completed a PhD in agricultural sciences at the university's Department of Animal Husbandry in 1972.

Professional career
As a trained agronomist, Snegur worked as the director of kolkhoz in the village of Lunga, Florești District, from 1961 to 1968. From 1968 to 1973, he was the director of the Experimental Station of Field Cultures. From 1973 to 1978, he was the director of the Main Agricultural Science Directorate of the Ministry of Agriculture. From 1978 to 1981, he worked as the general director of the Selectia Research Institute of Field Crops.

Political career
Snegur first became a member of the Communist Party of Moldova in 1964. In 1981, he became the Secretary of the Communist Party committee of Edineț district until 1985. That year, he became Secretary of the Central Committee of the Communist Party of Moldavia SSR, serving until 1989. On 29 July 1989, he was appointed as the Chairman of the Presidium of the Supreme Soviet of Moldavia, serving in this role until 27 April 1990. On 27 April, he became the Chairman of the Supreme Soviet of Moldavian SSR, which became the Moldovan SSR on 23 June. On 3 September, he became President of the Moldovan SSR, a constituent republic of the Soviet Union.

On 23 May 1991, Snegur became the president of the Republic of Moldova, still a constituent republic of the USSR. In August 1991, Moldova declared its independence from the Soviet Union, and on 27 August 1991, Snegur was elected as the first president of Moldova as an independent state. Snegur was opposed to immediate reunification with Romania, which led to a split with the Popular Front of Moldova in October 1991. Snegur decided to run as an independent candidate in the December 1991 presidential election, running unopposed after the Popular Front's efforts to organize a voter boycott failed.

On 3 September 1991, Snegur created the National Army of Moldova. In December 1991, Snegur signed the act that made Moldova a full member of the Confederacy of Independent States (CIS), and on 2 March 1992, Moldova became a member of the United Nations. On 29 June 1994, a new Constitution of Moldova was adopted, and on 26 June 1995, Moldova was admitted as a member of the Council of Europe.

In 1995, Snegur founded the Party of Rebirth and Conciliation of Moldova with former members of the Agrarian Party of Moldova. Snegur ran as the Party of Rebirth and Conciliation's candidate in the 1996 presidential election, where he won a plurality, but not a majority, of votes in the first round. However, Parliamentary speaker Petru Lucinschi surprised the nation with an upset victory over Snegur in the second round. Snegur continued as President until 15 January 1997.

Personal life
In 1960, he married Georgeta Snegur (23 April 1937 – 23 December 2019), and has a daughter, Natalia Gherman, and a son.

Honours and awards
  Order of the Republic
  Order for Merits to Lithuania
  Order of the Badge of Honour
  Medal "For Labour Valour"

References

1939 births
Living people
People from Florești District
Presidents of Moldova
Party leaders of the Soviet Union
Presidents of the Moldovan Parliament
Moldovan MPs 1990–1994
Recipients of the Order of the Republic (Moldova)
Recipients of the Order for Merits to Lithuania
Agrarian Party of Moldova politicians
Romanian people of Moldovan descent